Erik Norgard (born November 4, 1965 in Bellevue, Washington) was a National Football League offensive lineman from 1989 through 1999.

1965 births
Living people
People from Houston
American football offensive linemen
Colorado Buffaloes football players
Houston Oilers players
Tennessee Oilers players
New York Jets players
San Antonio Riders players
Sportspeople from Bellevue, Washington